John Herron, served as Mayor of Pittsburgh from 1849 to 1850. He was a Whig. He was the son of Dr. Francis Herron, the well-known Presbyterian Minister. The Herrons were among the founding families of Pittsburgh. He captained the Duquesne Grays in the Mexican War during the Siege of Veracruz. His war feats greatly enhanced his electability and President Zachary Taylor visited the city during Mayor Herron's term.

See also

 List of Mayors of Pittsburgh

References

 South Pittsburgh Development Corporation 
 Political Graveyard

Mayors of Pittsburgh
American military personnel of the Mexican–American War
Year of birth missing
Year of death missing